Desulfuromonas chloroethenica is a gram-negative metal-reducing proteobacterium. It uses tetrachloroethylene and trichloroethylene as electron acceptors.

References

Further reading

External links

LPSN
Type strain of Desulfuromonas chloroethenica at BacDive -  the Bacterial Diversity Metadatabase

Desulfuromonadales
Bacteria described in 1997